Dolphinton railway station served the village of Dolphinton, Lanarkshire, Scotland, from 1867 to 1945 on the Dolphinton branch.

History 
The station opened on 1 March 1867 by the Caledonian Railway. To the east was the goods yard where a shed was built in 1906. It closed in 1915. The station closed on 12 September 1932 but reopened on 17 July 1933. The shed was removed around this time. The station closed permanently on 4 June 1945. Only part of the platform remains but the goods yard is now the site of housing.

References

External links 
RailScot

Former Caledonian Railway stations
Railway stations in Great Britain opened in 1867
Railway stations in Great Britain closed in 1932
Railway stations in Great Britain opened in 1933
Railway stations in Great Britain closed in 1945 
1867 establishments in Scotland
1945 disestablishments in Scotland